Mario Huys (born 1959) is a former professional triathlete from Belgium who is currently living in Austria. He is the head coach and managing director of Mario Huys Coaching. Huys holds a master's degree in sports science. He is a former coach of the Oakley Transition Ironman Team and founding member of Triangel Institut, Ironman Nice and Ironman 70.3 Monaco.

Athletic career highlights 

 Former world record holder for double Ironman 19:54 (two Ironman races consecutively, both under 10 hours)
 Coached two pro triathletes to each break the world record (Luc Van Lierde and Yvonne van Vlerken)
 Completed 18 Ironman branded races as well as 24 Ironman distance triathlons for a total of 42 Ironman finishes
 Won 11 Long distance races
 Vice European Champion Ironman Distance Köln 1985
 Ironman personal best time 8:19
 Best finish at the Ironman World Championships - 11th place
 Ironman Hawaii best time 8:48
 Marathon personal best 2:28
 Member Belgian Olympic rowing team
 Professional Triathlete for 14 years
 Semi Professional Cyclist for 2 years by ADR Greg LeMond’s team
 Skiing instructor, mountain guide, rafting guide, canyoning guide and paraglider

Coaching highlights 
 Philippe Methion France (European and French Triathlon Champ)
 Luc Van Lierde Belgium (Hawaii Ironman Champ)
 Kate Allen Australia (Olympic Gold and 2 Ironman wins)
 Daniel Hechenblaickner Austria (International Triathlon and Duathlon Champ)
 Yvonne van Vlerken Netherlands (World Duathlon and Ironman Champ)
 Manuel Wyss Switzerland (National Champ)
 Irina Kirchler Austria (National Champ, Olympic team Austria)
 Scott Ragsdale United States (7 IM in Emirates in 7 days)
 José Jeuland France (National Champ)

Pro athletes currently coached by Mario 
 Michael Weiss Austria (Olympian, Ironman Champ and Xterra Champ)
 Josef Fuchs Austria (World Champion FIS Masters, 2 x Bronze FIS Masters and Silver Medallist)
 Lisa Reiss Austria (professional alpine skier)
 Dorian Wagner Germany (National Champ)

References

External links 

Oakley Transition Ironman Team
Starcoaching
Triangle Institut

Belgian male triathletes
Triathlon coaches
1959 births
Living people
Sportspeople from Bruges